Oak Grove is an unincorporated community in Point Township, Posey County, in the U.S. state of Indiana.

Geography

References

Unincorporated communities in Posey County, Indiana
Unincorporated communities in Indiana